The 2012–13 Premier League of Belize was the second season of the highest competitive football league in Belize, after it was founded in 2011. There were two seasons which were spread over two years, the opening (which was played towards the end of 2012) and the closing (which was played at the beginning of 2013).

Opening season

All but one of the 12 teams that competed in the 2012 Premier League of Belize continued to play in the opening season of 2012–13, with the exception of World FC who were replaced by R.G. City Boys United from Belize City.

The league is split into two zones; Zone A and Zone B. Each team will play teams in their zone twice, plus four out-of-zone games, meaning each team plays a total of 14 regular season games. Subsequently the top 2 teams from each zone advances to the playoffs. The opening season commenced on 25 August 2012.

The Round 10 game between Juventus and Belize Defence Force scheduled for 4 November 2012 was abandoned at half time due to rain, with Belize Defence Force leading 3-0. Juventus forfeited the game on 23 November 2012, giving the 3-0 victory to Belize Defence Force.

The Round 14 game between San Pedro Seadogs and Juventus scheduled for 2 December 2012 was forfeited by Juventus, giving the 3-0 victory to San Pedro Seadogs.

Teams

Zone A

Zone B

League table

Zone A

Zone B

Results

Round 1 

Zone A

Zone B

Round 2 

Zone A

Zone B

Round 3 

Zone A

Zone B

Round 4 

Zone A

Zone B

Round 5 

Zone A

Zone B

Round 6 

Open Zone

Round 7 

Open Zone

Round 8 

Open Zone

Round 9 

Open Zone

Round 10 

Zone A

Zone B

Round 11 

Zone A

Zone B

Round 12 

Zone A

Zone B

Round 13 

Zone A

Zone B

Round 14 

Zone A

Zone B

Playoffs

Semi-finals 

Game One

Game Two

Finals 

Game One

Game Two

Season statistics

Top scorers

(*) Please note playoff goals are included.

Hat tricks

 5 Player scored 5 goals

Awards
On 28 December 2012, the Premier League of Belize Commissioner, Myito Perdomo announced the 2012-13 opening season Individual Awards for the regular season.

Closing season

Only 8 of the 12 teams competing in the opening season continued to play in the closing season. Juventus, Paradise/Freedom Fighters, R.G. City Boys United and San Pedro Seadogs were the absentees.

Instead of being split into two groups, like the opening season, there would be one league consisting of 8 teams. The closing season commenced on 9 February 2013.

The Round 8 game between Police United and Placencia Assassins played on 28 March 2013 which was originally won by Placencia 3-0 was overturned after a successful protest by Police United, meaning the latter were awarded the 3-0 victory by default.

Teams

League table

Results

Round 1

Round 2

Round 3

Round 4

Round 5

Round 6

Round 7

Round 8

Round 9

Round 10

Round 11

Round 12

Round 13

Round 14

Playoffs

Semi-finals 

Game One

Game Two

Finals 

Game One

Game Two

Season statistics

Top scorers

(*) Please note playoff goals are included.

Hat tricks

Awards
In the post-game ceremonies of the final game of the season, the Football Federation of Belize President, Ruperto Vicente and the Premier League of Belize Commissioner, Myito Perdomoto delivered the trophies and individual awards for both regular season and the playoffs for the 2012-13 closing season.

References

Top level Belizean football league seasons
1
Bel